Phiditia diores is a moth in the Phiditiidae family. It was described by Pieter Cramer in 1775.

References

Bombycoidea
Moths described in 1775
Taxa named by Pieter Cramer